Laurence Henry Maguire (born 8 February 1997) is an English professional footballer who plays as a defender for Chesterfield.

Club career
Maguire started his career in the academy at Chesterfield, where he was the captain before being handed his first professional contract by the Spireites on 1 June 2015. He made his professional debut in the club's 2–1 EFL Trophy victory against Wolverhampton Wanderers U23 on 30 August 2016. He then made his League One debut in the 3–3 home draw with Gillingham on 27 September. He scored his first senior goal on 6 December in a 2–0 EFL Trophy win at Rochdale.

On 17 February 2017, Maguire was sent out on loan to AFC Fylde of National League North until 21 March. The next day, he made his debut in a 3–1 win over Brackley Town.

International career
In October 2018 he was called up to the England C squad.

Personal life
Maguire's older brothers, Joe and Harry, are also footballers. Joe plays for Sheffield FC and Harry plays for Manchester United and  the England national team.

Career statistics

References

External links

1997 births
Living people
Footballers from Sheffield
Chesterfield F.C. players
AFC Fylde players
English Football League players
National League (English football) players
Association football defenders
English footballers
People from Mosborough
England semi-pro international footballers